Coffin corner may refer to:

 Coffin corner (aviation), an unstable combination of speed and altitude
 A position in a bomber formation combat box
 Coffin corner (American football), a strategy used by a punter in American football
 The Coffin Corner, a magazine published by the Professional Football Researchers Association

See also
Coffins Corner, New Jersey